Alexis Mac Allister (born 24 December 1998) is an Argentine professional footballer who plays as a midfielder for  club Brighton & Hove Albion and the Argentina national team.

Born to a footballing family, Mac Allister started his senior career with Argentinos Juniors in 2016, winning the Argentine second division in his debut season. He joined Brighton & Hove Albion in 2019 but was immediately loaned back to Juniors until the end of the season. During his second year at Brighton, he was again loaned to Argentina to Boca Juniors, where he won the 2019–20 Primera División. Returning from the loan the following season, Mac Allister had his breakthrough year for Brighton, becoming a key player for the Premier League side.

Mac Allister represented Argentina at under-23 level, winning the 2020 CONMEBOL Pre-Olympic Tournament and playing at the 2020 Olympic Games. He made his senior international debut in 2019 and was part of the Argentina squad that won the 2022 Finalissima with a 3–0 victory against Italy, and represented his country at the 2022 FIFA World Cup, where he played an integral role in the team that ultimately won the tournament, with him assisting Ángel Di María's goal in the final against France.

Club career

Argentinos Juniors 
Like his two brothers, Mac Allister started his career with Club Social y Deportivo Parque before joining Argentinos Juniors' youth setup. He made his professional debut on 30 October 2016, coming on as a second-half substitute for Iván Colman in a 0–0 Primera B Nacional home draw against Central Córdoba.

Mac Allister scored his first professional goal on 10 March 2017, netting a 2–1 away loss against Instituto. He contributed with three goals in 23 appearances during his first senior campaign, as his side achieved promotion to Primera División as champions. He made his debut in the latter category on 9 September, starting in a 2–1 loss at Patronato.

On 25 November 2017, Mac Allister and his two brothers played all together for the first time in a 1–0 loss at San Lorenzo; Alexis and Francis were starters, while Kevin came in as a substitute. He scored his first goal in the top tier on 5 March 2018, netting the opener in a 2–0 home defeat of Boca Juniors.

Brighton & Hove Albion 
On 24 January 2019, Mac Allister signed for English Premier League club Brighton & Hove Albion on a four-and-a-half-year contract.

Loan to Argentinos Juniors 
As part of the Brighton deal, Mac Allister was loaned back to Argentinos Juniors for the remainder of the 2018–19 Premier League season.

Loan to Boca Juniors 
In June 2019, Boca Juniors completed the loan signing of Mac Allister, linking him up with brother Kevin, who had joined the club on loan six months prior. Mac Allister netted on his Boca debut, scoring the club's only goal in the first leg of a Copa Libertadores round of sixteen victory over Athletico Paranaense on 25 July. On 5 August, Mac Allister played his first league game for Boca as he came on as a substitute in a 2–0 away victory against Patronato.

2019–20 season 
He made his debut for the club as an 80th-minute substitute in a 0–0 draw away to Wolverhampton Wanderers on 7 March 2020. This match proved to be Brighton's last until the Premier League restart in June due to the COVID-19 pandemic. Mac Allister played his first home game for Brighton where he came on as a substitute in a 2–1 victory over Arsenal on 20 June. He made his first start for Brighton three days later, in a 0–0 draw away against Leicester City, playing 58 minutes before being substituted.

2020–21 season 
Mac Allister scored his first Brighton goal on 17 September 2020, netting in a header in a 4–0 home victory over Portsmouth in the EFL Cup. He scored again six days later, this goal also coming in the EFL Cup where Brighton claimed a 2–0 away victory over Preston. On 18 October, Mac Allister scored his first Premier League goal scoring a 90th minute leveller in a 1–1 away draw against bitter rivals Crystal Palace.

2021–22 season 
Mac Allister scored the winner and his second-ever Premier League goal as Brighton fought back from a goal behind to beat Burnley 2–1 at Turf Moor on 14 August in the opening game of the 2021–22 season. He supplied assists to both of Aaron Connolly's goals on 22 September, in the 2–0 home victory over Swansea City in the EFL Cup third round. He later went off injured. Mac Allister scored his second goal of the season on 23 October, scoring an 81st-minute penalty in a 4–1 home defeat at Falmer Stadium. He scored his first brace in a 3–2 away win over Everton on 2 January 2022, putting Brighton 1–0 up in the 3rd minute, and putting them 3–1 up in the 71st with an excellent finish from the edge of the box. Mac Allister provided Adam Webster's headed equaliser from a corner in the 1–1 home draw against the European champions, Chelsea, on 18 January.

2022–23 season 
In the opening game of the season against Manchester United, Mac Allister scored an own goal in a 2–1 victory that saw Brighton claim their first ever win at Old Trafford. Two weeks later, he found the right net, scoring from the penalty spot in the 2–0 away win over West Ham, and scored another penalty in a 2–1 defeat at Fulham. Mac Allister scored a brace including a third penalty in four games after having a goal ruled out by VAR in the 5–2 home win over Leicester. On 24 October, Mac Allister signed a new contract, committing him to Brighton until at least June 2025, with an option for an additional year. He scored after 49 seconds in the home tie against Aston Villa on 13 November, however Villa went on to win the match 2–1. 

He returned post his World Cup victory on 4 January 2023 in a 4-1 away victory over Everton, where he came as a substitute in the 62nd minute. On 7 January 2023, he put in a professional performance. Mac Allister scored two goals, the first of which is a sublime flick finish from a Pervis Estupiñán ball, in the 5–1 away win over EFL Championship side Middlesbrough in the FA Cup third round. At his return to Brighton's home stadium after world cup victory, the midfielder wore his winner's medal as he walked out onto the pitch ahead of the match and the World Cup trophy was also on show to the fans in Falmer Stadium. Eventually Brighton defeated Liverpool 3–0 in a home win.

International career

Youth and senior debuts 
Soon after debuting for Argentinos, Mac Allister received a call-up from Claudio Úbeda for the Argentina under-20s. He was selected for the senior team for the first time in August 2019, ahead of friendlies in the United States in September versus Chile and Mexico. His international bow arrived in the match with Chile at the Los Angeles Coliseum on 5 September.

Tokyo Olympics 
On 1 July 2021, Mac Allister was named in the Argentinean Olympic squad for the 2020 Summer Olympics in Tokyo, taking place in 2021 due to the previous year's postponement as a result of coronavirus. He played in Argentina's opening game against Australia starting the match, playing 78 minutes of the eventual 2–0 defeat at the Sapporo Dome in Sapporo on 22 July. He started the next two group games, a 1–0 victory over Egypt on 25 July again being played in the Sapporo Dome and a 1–1 draw with Spain on 28 July at the Saitman Stadium in Midori-ku, Saitama. Argentina were eliminated finishing third in their group on goal difference.

Recall into senior squad and World Cup victory 
Mac Allister was recalled to the Argentina national team's senior squad in January 2022 after two-and-a-half years since his first two caps. However, he tested positive for Covid-19 and missed Argentina's 2022 FIFA World Cup qualifier away win over Chile. He eventually made his first appearance for the national side for almost three years where he started in the 3–0 home win over Venezuela on 25 March. Five days later, in the draw with Ecuador he was forced off with after being a victim of a knee-high challenge. Due to the subsequent injury, he was returned to Brighton ahead of their next fixture. On 1 June, Mac Allister was an unused substitute as Argentina beat Italy in the 2022 Finalissima held at Wembley Stadium.

On 11 November, Mac Allister was named in Argentina's 26-man squad for the 2022 FIFA World Cup. In the last group game against Poland on 30 November, he scored his first international goal opening the score line in the eventual 2–0 win, seeing Argentina through to the round of 16 as group champions. After Argentina made the final, Mac Allister started the match against defending champions France where he assisted Ángel Di María's goal to make the score 2–0. In the second half of extra time, Mac Allister was substituted before Argentina won the competition following a penalty shootout.

Personal life 
Mac Allister was born in Santa Rosa, La Pampa.

Mac Allister's older brothers Francis and Kevin are also professional footballers. They are the sons of "Red" Carlos Mac Allister and nephews of Patricio Mac Allister, both retired footballers. Mac Allister is a family name originating from Scotland and Ireland. Mac Allister's more recent ancestry is of Irish descent. In a previous interview, he confirmed some of his ancestors arrived in Argentina from Ireland and stated that he is aware of links to Scotland. His ancestors can be linked to Donabate, Ireland. He can also trace ancestry to Fife in Eastern Scotland, then to Argentina.

Career statistics

Club

International 

 Argentina score listed first, score column indicates score after each Mac Allister goal.

Honours 
Argentinos Juniors
 Primera B Nacional: 2016–17

Boca Juniors
 Primera División: 2019–20

Argentina Olympic
 CONMEBOL Pre-Olympic Tournament: 2020

Argentina
 FIFA World Cup: 2022
 CONMEBOL–UEFA Cup of Champions: 2022

References

External links 

 

1998 births
Living people
People from Santa Rosa, La Pampa
Argentine footballers
Association football midfielders
Argentinos Juniors footballers
Brighton & Hove Albion F.C. players
Boca Juniors footballers
Primera Nacional players
Argentine Primera División players
Premier League players
Olympic footballers of Argentina
Footballers at the 2020 Summer Olympics
Argentina international footballers
2022 FIFA World Cup players
FIFA World Cup-winning players
Argentine people of Irish descent
Alexis
Argentine people of Scottish descent